Anelis Kaiser is professor of gender studies at MINT, University of Freiburg, Germany. She is also on the lecturer within the social psychology and social neuroscience department at the University of Bern, Switzerland. Along with Isabelle Dussauge, Kaiser was a guest editor of a special issue on Neuroscience and sex/gender of the journal Neuroethics, they also co-founded The NeuroGenderings Network together.

Education 
Kaiser gained her PhD from the University of Basel in 2008.

Research 
Her work explores the influence of heteronormative notions of sexual orientation and the bias, by some within the scientific community, to demonstrate sex/gender determinism and led her to become a co-founder of The NeuroGenderings Network.

Bibliography

Chapters in books

Journal articles 
 
 
 
 
 
 
See also:

See also 
 Cognitive neuroscience
 Gender essentialism
 Neuroscience of sex differences
 List of cognitive neuroscientists
 List of developmental psychologists

References

External links 
 

German cognitive neuroscientists
Date of birth unknown
Developmental psychologists
Living people
University of Basel alumni
Academic staff of the University of Bern
Academic staff of the University of Freiburg
Swiss neuroscientists
Swiss women neuroscientists
Year of birth missing (living people)